The crater Oskison is located in the far northern hemisphere of Mercury, in the plains north of Caloris basin. Oskison is a distinctive crater with a large central peak that exposes material excavated from depth. Many chains of secondary craters are visible radiating from Oskison outward onto the surrounding smooth plains.

References

Impact craters on Mercury